The class P was a series of steam locomotives of the Danish State Railways, designed by chief mechanical engineer O.F.A. Busse and introduced in 1907. With a wheel arrangement of 4-4-2 (2'B1 in UIC classification), they were well suited to express trains, and were the first steam locomotives in Denmark heavier than 100 tonnes. They saw service on most DSB main lines, but were at their best on the relatively level Copenhagen to Korsør and Fredericia to Esbjerg services. 

Due to shortages of powerful locomotives with low axle load during World War II, seven of the class P locomotives were rebuilt to a 4-6-2 arrangement and designated class PR, starting in 1943. Two of the class P locomotives have been preserved, as well as one unit of class PR.

References

External links

 DSB litra P (II) at Jernbanen.dk

4-4-2 locomotives
P 901
Steam locomotives of Denmark
Railway locomotives introduced in 1907
Hanomag locomotives
Berliner locomotives
Passenger locomotives
Standard gauge locomotives of Denmark